Per Severin Hjermann (5 April 1891 – 13 June 1972) was a Norwegian politician for the Farmer's Party.

He was born in Lærdal.

He was elected to the Norwegian Parliament from Sogn og Fjordane in 1954, and was re-elected on one occasion.

On the local level Hjermann held various positions in Lærdal municipal council from 1925 to 1955, and served as mayor from 1937 to 1953, interrupted by the German occupation of Norway from 1940 to 1945. He was also chairman of Sogn og Fjordane county council from 1945 to 1954.

Outside politics he was a farmer. He was involved in the Norwegian Agrarian Association, and chaired the Noregs elveeigarlag from 1948 to 1956.

References

1891 births
1972 deaths
Centre Party (Norway) politicians
Members of the Storting
Mayors of places in Sogn og Fjordane
20th-century Norwegian politicians
People from Lærdal